Sacred conversation is a genre developed in Italian Renaissance painting.

Sacred Conversation may also refer to:

 Madonna and Child with Saint Catherine and Saint Mary Magdalene, by Giovanni Bellini ( 1490), now in the Gallerie dell'Accademia, Venice
 Madonna and Child with Saint Mary Magdalene and Saint Ursula, by Giovanni Bellini (1490), now in the Museo del Prado, Madrid
 Sacred Conversation (Bellini, Madrid, 1505–1510), by Giovanni Bellini, now in the Thyssen-Bornemisza Museum, Madrid